was a national motor racing championship that takes place in Japan. It is a junior-level feeder formula that uses small single seater Formula Three chassis.

As a result of Formula 3 naming regulations by the FIA, on 13 August 2019, series promoter Japan Race Promotion (jp), split from the Regional Formula 3 formula and rebranded their series as Super Formula Lights to comply with FIA regulations, and remain as the Super Formula feeder championship since the series is prohibited from using "Formula 3" (which belongs to the FIA for the European-based FIA Formula 3 Championship) and "Formula Regional" (which all regional Formula 3 series are being renamed by the 2020 season, first with the Formula Regional European Championship in 2019 for Europe, and the renaming of the North American F3 championship from Formula 3 Americas to Formula Regional Americas Championship).  The Series will adopt Euroformula Open Championship regulations.
 
Subsequently, the FIA awarded rights to a Formula Regional championship in Japan to K2, promoters of the F4 Japanese Championship, which will name their series the Formula Regional Japanese Championship.  

With the rebranding of the series to Super Formula Lights, the Japanese Formula 3 championship officially ended after 41 years.  The Japan Formula 3 Association will continue to run the new championship as stated on 28 February 2020.

History
The first Formula Three championship to take place in Japan was held by Nippon Formula 3 Association (Japanese Formula 3 Association) in 1979, which was won by Toshio Suzuki. By 1981, it had evolved into a national-level series, the Japanese Championship, and was organised by the Japan Automobile Federation (JAF).

Foreign drivers' participation has increased since the 1980s and the majority of champions have been foreign since the beginning of the 1990s.

Since 2008 a two-tier championship system was adopted as a bid to increase driver and team participation. The "Championship" class was open to cars conforming to the current three-year cycle, whilst the lower tier "National" class was open to cars meeting the previous three-year cycle and using the spec Toyota engine.

Prior to the changing of super license requirements for the 2016 Formula One season onward,
the series used to be one of the four major Formula Three championships that guaranteed the winner an FIA Super Licence. Under the new requirements the winner of the championship earns 10 points towards their super license, with drivers finishing from 2nd to 5th in the final standings receiving a smaller number of points.

Equipment

Like most Formula Three championships, competitors in the Japanese Championship are permitted to use any eligible chassis.

 Chassis:
 Only Dallara chassis have been used since 2007. In the past, March, Reynard, Ralt, and Japanese manufacturers like TOM'S and Dome also had supplied chassis.
 Engines:
 Engines are supplied by Toyota-TOM'S, Mugen-Honda, Toda Racing and ThreeBond (Nissan). Volkswagen, HKS (Mitsubishi), Fiat and Opel had previously supplied engines.
 Tyres:
 Hankook will supply tyres in 2009 as the series' sole supplier. Bridgestone, Dunlop and Yokohama had supplied tyres until 1987. In 1988, Bridgestone took place of the series' sole tyre supplier and supplied until 2008.

Champions

References

External links
Japan Formula 3 official website – Japanese / English
All-Japan Formula 3 Championship at forix.com

 
Auto racing series in Japan
1979 establishments in Japan
2019 disestablishments in Japan
Recurring sporting events established in 1979
Recurring sporting events disestablished in 2019
Formula Three series
National championships in Japan